The 1955–56 season was Colchester United's 14th season in their history and their sixth season in the Third Division South, the third tier of English football. Alongside competing in the Third Division South, the club also participated in the FA Cup in which the club were eliminated by Torquay United in the first round. The season was Benny Fenton's first full campaign in charge, and after building his own squad over the summer, he led Colchester to their highest position since the 1951–52 season with a 12th-placed finish. This came on the back of two consecutive seasons of successful re-election applications.

Season overview
Manager Benny Fenton assembled his own squad for the 1955–56 season, bringing in goalkeeper Percy Ames from Tottenham Hotspur, while also signing a number of players from Scottish junior football including John Fowler, Bobby Hill and Sammy McLeod.

Fenton's side played an exciting attacking game. They scored 76 goals in the league, with Kevin McCurley scoring a club Football League best total of 29 goals, and strike partner Ken Plant scoring 17. Both players notched two hat-tricks each during the season as the club safely finished the campaign in 12th-place.

Colchester played their first game under floodlights on 28 February 1955 when they beat Reading 3–1 at Elm Park. While Layer Road was still bereft of floodlighting, lighting had been installed for training purposes at the ground.

Players

Transfers

In

 Total spending:  ~ £1,000

Out

 Total incoming:  ~ £9,000

Match details

Third Division South

Results round by round

League table

Matches

FA Cup

Squad statistics

Appearances and goals

|-
!colspan="14"|Players who appeared for Colchester who left during the season

|}

Goalscorers

Clean sheets
Number of games goalkeepers kept a clean sheet.

Player debuts
Players making their first-team Colchester United debut in a fully competitive match.

See also
List of Colchester United F.C. seasons

References

General
Books

Websites

Specific

1955-56
English football clubs 1955–56 season